Paul Mente (born 21 February 1985 in King William's Town, South Africa) is a rugby referee on the National A Panel of the South African Rugby Union.

Career

Mente attended Masikhanyise High School and played rugby as an amateur growing up. He joined the national panel in 2016, officiating in the 2018 Currie Cup First Division.

References

Living people
South African rugby union referees
SARU referees
Currie Cup referees
1985 births
People from Qonce